Greek-Swiss relations are foreign relations between Greece and Switzerland.  Both countries established diplomatic relations in 1830.  Switzerland opened its consulate in 1865.
Greece has an embassy in Bern, a general consulate in Geneva, and two honorary consulates in Zürich and Lugano.  Switzerland has an embassy in Athens and four consulates (Thessaloniki, Corfu, Patras, Rhodes).

Relations
Greece and Switzerland have a long tradition of relations. Before and during the Congress of Vienna in 1815 Ioannis Kapodistrias, a native of Corfu in the service of Tsar Alexander I of Russia, laboured successfully for reorganisation of the Swiss Confederation and for the international recognition of Swiss neutrality. In 1816, he became the first honorary citizen of the city of Lausanne and in 1827, the first Governor of the Hellenic State. Switzerland was one of the nations that supported the creation of the Greek state in 1830. Two natives of Geneva exercised important functions in the newly constituted Greek monarchy: Jean-Gabriel Eynard as one of the founders of the National Bank of Greece (1842) and Louis-André Gosse was involved in fighting the plague epidemic of 1827 and was a commander in the Hellenic Navy.

During the Second World War, Switzerland represented the interests of numerous countries in occupied Greece and supported the civilian population. During the rule of military junta in Greece, many opposition figures found refuge in Switzerland. The Swiss Committee for the Restoration of Democracy in Greece was formed in Bern in 1967.
 
Greece and Switzerland have a number of treaties between the two countries, mainly dealing with commerce.  Some of the major treaties between the countries deal with Social Security and the avoidance of double taxation in respect of income tax.

Trade
The balance of trade between Greece and Switzerland is generally toward Switzerland, with Greece having a constant trade deficit.  Between 2006 and 2007, Swiss exports to Greece increased 12.9%, while Greek exports to Switzerland increased 26.4%.  The main Swiss products imported into Greece are pharmaceuticals and medical supplies, watches, clocks and other luxury goods, machinery and high technology products, electronic equipment, and specific types of food.  The main Greek products imported into Switzerland are food and beverages, chemicals, construction materials, and textiles.  There are about 48 Swiss companies in Greece which employ about 10,000 people in Greece.  Around 300,000 Swiss vacationers visit Greece every year.

Greek population
About 11,000 Greeks live in Switzerland, with about 7,000 of them living in Zurich.  Most major Swiss towns have a Greek association or community.  There are  2,921 Swiss living in Greece.

Notable people
Κρατερός Κατσούλης - Swiss-born actor and tv presenter in Greece
Panos Mouzourakis - Swiss-born actor - comedian  and singer
Sofia Milos - Swiss-born actress
Σεράινα Καζαμία - half Swiss model - GNTM winner
Melia Kreiling - Swiss-born American actress
Giorgio A. Tsoukalos - Swiss-born writer, ufologist, television presenter and producer
Theodore Modis - is a strategic business analyst, futurist, physicist, and international consultant 
Yorgo Modis - a Wellcome Trust Senior Research Fellow, and Reader in Virology and Immunology, at the Department of Medicine, University of Cambridge. He is head of The Modis Lab in the Molecular Immunity Unit at the MRC Laboratory of Molecular Biology.
Josef Zisyadis - politician
Nico Georgiadis - Swiss chess player
Kosta Zafiriou - musician
Alex Fontana - Swiss racing driver of Greek descent
John Antonakis -  professor of organizational behavior at the Faculty of Business and Economics of the University of Lausanne and current editor-in-chief of The Leadership Quarterly
Hélène Guisan - writer
Nanos Valaoritis - Swiss-born writer, poet, novelist and playwright 
Leonidas Stergiou -  Swiss professional footballer
Giorgios Nemtsoudis - Swiss footballer
Βάσιας Αλεξανδράκης - son of Greek actor Αλέκος Αλεξανδράκης and Swiss Verena Gauer Greek citizen
Γιοχάνα Αλεξανδράκη - daughter Greek actor Αλέκος Αλεξανδράκης and Swiss Verena Gauer Swiss citizen
Σταύρος Νιάρχος - Greek shipowner

Diplomacy

Republic of Greece
Bern (Embassy)
Geneva (Consulate-General) 

Republic of Switzerland
Athens (Embassy)

See also
Foreign relations of Greece
Foreign relations of Switzerland
Greeks in Switzerland
Switzerland–EU relations

Notes and references

External links
Greek Ministry of Foreign Affairs about relations with Switzerland
 Swiss Federal Department of Foreign Affairs about relations with Greece

 
Switzerland
Greece